Frauenfeld can be:

in Switzerland
 Frauenfeld, city in Switzerland
 Frauenfeld District, a district in Switzerland
 FC Frauenfeld, a Swiss football team
 Buch bei Frauenfeld, a village in Switzerland

people
 Alfred Frauenfeld, Alfred Eduard Frauenfeld (1898-1977), an Austrian Nazi leader
 Georg Ritter von Frauenfeld (1807-1873), an Austrian naturalist